Valérie Cornetet, is a French professor and aerospace engineer. Since the 1st of July 2022, she is the director-general of the Institut polytechnique des sciences avancées (French private aerospace university).

Biography

Graduate from the ENSTA Paris (promotion 1990) and École polytechnique (promotion 2006), Valérie Cornetet started her career as a Product Development Manager for Saint-Gobain. Then, she became Product Manager for Mov'eo, the INRETS and Sopemea.

In 2011, she is appointed Head of Innovation Management and Intellectual Property for Siemens.

She joined the higher education in 2020 as deputy of general director of the Institut polytechnique des sciences avancées, a French private aeronautical and aerospace engineering grande école located in Ivry-sur-Seine (close to Paris) and Toulouse.
She became the CEO of the College in July 2020, following the departure of Francis Pollet.

Beside her working activities, she has a community life.

Bibliography
 Académie nationale de l'air et de l'espace and Lucien Robineau, Les français du ciel, dictionnaire historique, Le Cherche midi, June 2005, 782 p.
 Le futur de l'avion : Les prochains défis de l’industrie aéronautique, Ivry-sur-Seine, FYP Éditions, 2020, 160 p.

References

Living people
Aviation in France
French aerospace engineers
Heads of universities in France
École Polytechnique alumni
Year of birth missing (living people)